is a Japanese actress and former singer, represented by Avex. She is a former member of the girl group AKB48. As an actress, she has starred in television series such as Come Come Everybody (2021) and was nominated for Best Supporting Actress at the 61st Blue Ribbon Awards in 2019.

Career

2012–2014 
Kawaei auditioned for AKB48 and was selected to join the 11th generation as a kenkyūsei (trainee) in July 2010.

In March 2012, she was promoted to Team 4, and was transferred to Team A in August. Soon after the TV series Shiritsu Bakaleya Kōkō ended on June 30, it was announced that Kawaei would participate in its film adaptation. The movie would star several members from the groups Johnny's Jr. and AKB48.

Kawaei was a member of the AKB48 subunit Anrire with Anna Iriyama and Rena Katō. They appeared in Rino Sashihara's 2012 single "Ikujinashi Masquerade", which charted at number one in the Japanese Oricon weekly singles chart.

In 2013, during a broadcast of a special episode of the comedy show Mecha-Mecha Iketeru!, it was announced that Kawaei would perform as center in a song of the special unit BKA48 that will be included on AKB48's single "Sayonara Crawl" to be released in May. At the 2013 AKB48 general election, she placed 25th with 26,764 votes, and thus gained a place as an Under Girl for the next single "Koi Suru Fortune Cookie".

Attack 

On May 25, 2014, during an event held at the Iwate Industry Culture & Convention Center in Takizawa, Iwate, she, along with Anna Iriyama and a staff member were attacked by a 24-year-old man wielding a handsaw, who was arrested at the scene on suspicion of attempted murder. All three victims suffered wounds including bone fractures on their fingers (reportedly, Kawaei's right thumb and Iriyama's right little finger were both fractured and cut, and the girls suffered wounds on their heads), and were taken to a hospital for surgery. The event, as well as all other group activities on that day, were halted.

2014–present 
At AKB48's 2014 general election she placed 16th with 39,120 votes and thus gained a place in the promotional line-up for the next single "Kokoro no Placard".

On March 26, 2015, Kawaei announced that she would leave AKB48 and transition to acting, citing her inability to participate in handshake events after the Iwate incident as the reason. She had her graduation ceremony during AKB48's Summer Concert in Saitama Super Arena on August 2 and had her last stage performance on August 4, 2015. In November 2015, it was announced that she would star with Mitsuki Takahata in the NHK morning drama Toto Neechan.

She made her debut voice role in the anime film , voicing Minifaruru, the younger sister of Faruru.

Personal life 
Kawaei married actor Tomoki Hirose in 2019. She has one child, born in November 2019.. 
On January 1, 2023, Kawaei announced her second pregnancy.

Discography

Singles with AKB48

With Anrire 
 "Ikujinashi Masquerade" (2012) – Rino Sashihara and Anrire

Other AKB48 songs 
 Sugar Rush (2012)

Stage units 
Team Kenkyūsei "Theater no Megami"
 
Team 4 1st Stage "Boku no Taiyou"
 
Team A Waiting Stage

Filmography

Films 
 Gekijōban Shiritsu Bakaleya Kōkō (October 13, 2012)
 PriPara Mi~nna no Akogare Let's Go PriPari (2016) as Mini-Falulu
 Death Note: Light Up the New World (2016) as Sakura Aoi
 Ajin: Demi-Human (2017) as Izumi Shimomura
 The Lies She Loved (2018) as Kokoha
 Koi no Shizuku (2018) as Shiori Tachibana
 Principal (2018) as Haruka Kunishige
 My Teacher, My Love (2018) as Aoi Nakamura
 Pokémon the Movie: The Power of Us (2018) as Risa (voice)
 The House Where the Mermaid Sleeps (2018)
 Don't Cry, Mr. Ogre (2019) as Yukino
 Until I Meet September's Love (2019)
 Diner (2019)
 Ride Your Wave (2019) as Hinako Mukaimizu (voice)
 Step (2020)
 Jigoku no Hanazono: Office Royale (2021)
 Summer Ghost (2021) as Ayane Satō (voice)

TV dramas 
 Majisuka Gakuen 2 (2011) as Rina
 Majisuka Gakuen 3 (2012) as Nanashi
 SHARK (2014) as Kaede Konno
 Sailor Zombie (2014) as Momoka Takizawa
 Gomen ne Seishun as Ai Jinbo
 Majisuka Gakuen 4 (2015) as Bakamono
 Majisuka Gakuen 5 (2015) as Bakamono
  (2016) (ep.3, guest appearance)
 Toto Neechan (2016) as Tomie Morita
 Death Cash (2016) as Shi Hei
 Hayako Sensei, Kekkon Surutte Honto Desu Ka? (2016) as Fuko Moriyama
 Koe Koi (2016) as Kaori Takashima (guest appearance)
 Death Note: New Generation (2016) as Sakura Aoi
 Frankenstein's Love (2017) as Mikoto
 Fugitive Boys (2017) as Koyoi Niizato
 Idaten (2019) as Chie
 Mr. Hiiragi's Homeroom (2019)
 Reach Beyond the Blue Sky (2021) as Ichijō Mikako
 Shitteru Waifu (2021) as Kenzaki Nagisa
 Come Come Everybody (2021) as Hinata

Japanese dub 
 Kubo and the Two Strings (2017) as The Sisters
 Soul (2020) as 22

TV variety shows 
  (TBS)
  (TV Tokyo)
  (Family Gekijō)
  (April 19, 2012, Yomiuri TV)
 AKBingo! (June 27, 2012, TV Tokyo)
  (October 12, 2012, Hikari TV Channel)

Awards

References

External links 
  on AKB48 website
 川榮李奈在755的頁面

1995 births
Living people
AKB48 members
Japanese idols
Musicians from Kanagawa Prefecture
Sony Music Entertainment Japan artists
Japanese film actresses
Japanese television actresses
21st-century Japanese actresses
21st-century Japanese singers
21st-century Japanese women singers
Stabbing survivors
Asadora lead actors